Piiri may refer to several places in Estonia:

Piiri, Saare County, village in Muhu Parish, Saare County
Piiri, Tartu County, village in Piirissaare Parish, Tartu County
Piiri, Valga County, village in Hummuli Parish, Valga County